The 1985 Nippon Professional Baseball season was the 36th season of operation for the league.

Regular season standings

Central League

Pacific League

Japan Series

Hanshin Tigers won the series 4-2.

See also
1985 Major League Baseball season

References

 
1985 in baseball
1985 in Japanese sport